Åkerström, sometimes written Akerstrom, is a Swedish surname. Notable people with the surname include:

Åke Åkerström (1902–1991), Swedish archaeologist and classical scholar
CajsaStina Åkerström (born 1967), Swedish singer, songwriter and author
Fred Åkerström (1937–1985), Swedish musician
Jan-Erik Åkerström (born 1935), Swedish bobsledder
Lola Akinmade Åkerström, Nigerian photographer and travel writer
Roger Åkerström (born 1967), Swedish ice hockey player
Rolf Åkerström (born 1960), Swedish bobsledder
Stig Åkerström (born 1953), Swedish footballer
Ullie Akerstrom (1864-1941), American actress and playwright

Swedish-language surnames